Jeanette Malm (born 21 February 1972 in Stockholm) is a Swedish modern pentathlete. She represented Sweden at the 2000 Summer Olympics held in Sydney, Australia in the women's modern pentathlon and she finished in 17th place.

References

External links 
 

1972 births
Living people
Swedish female modern pentathletes
Olympic modern pentathletes of Sweden
Modern pentathletes at the 2000 Summer Olympics
Sportspeople from Stockholm